Problepsis triocellata is a moth of the  family Geometridae. It is found in northern Australia and on Sulawesi.

Subspecies
Problepsis triocellata triocellata
Problepsis triocellata scenica (Prout, 1938) (Sulawesi)

References

Moths described in 1908
Scopulini
Moths of Indonesia
Moths of Australia